Indira Gandhi Children's hospital located in Kabul is a Children's hospital of Afghanistan.  It has 150 beds and in 2004 started the first cerebral palsy center in Afghanistan.  It also has an artificial limb center opened with help of Indian government which can fit up to 1000 people with jaipur feet

Some Indian physicians working at this hospital died in the February 2010 Kabul attack conducted by Taliban.

References

Hospitals in Kabul
Children's hospitals in Afghanistan
Monuments and memorials to Indira Gandhi
Cerebral palsy organizations